Towner can refer to:

People
 Daniel B. Towner (1850-1919), American hymn composer
 Edgar Thomas Towner (1890-1972), Australian recipient of the Victoria Cross
 Horace Mann Towner (1855-1937), American politician and governor of Puerto Rico
 James E. Towner (1851–1935), New York politician
 John Towner (born 1933), former Australian rules footballer
 Ralph Towner (born 1940), American musician, composer and bandleader
 Tony Towner (born 1955), English former footballer

Places
 Towner, Colorado, a census-designated place
 Towner, North Dakota, a city and the seat of McHenry County 
 Towner County, North Dakota

Other
 Kia Towner, a variation of the small van Daihatsu Hijet
 USS Towner (AKA-77), an attack cargo ship
 Towners (NYCRR station), a New York Central Railroad station
 Towner Gallery
"Towner", a song by Spoon from their 1996 album Telephono